Borden Manufacturing Company, also known as Goldsboro Cotton Mills and Wayne Cotton Mills, is a historic factory complex located at Goldsboro, Wayne County, North Carolina.  The complex includes the Goldsboro Cotton Mills (1892), Goldsboro Smokestack (1905), Goldsboro Boiler Room (c. 1940), Borden-Goldsboro Pedestrian Bridge (c. 1940), Borden Manufacturing Company (1900), Borden Water Tank (c. 1930), Borden Auto Garage (c. 1915), Borden Reservoir (c. 1900), Borden Reservoir Pump House (c. 1920), Borden Railroad Siding Tracks (c. 1900), Borden Conditioning Room (c. 1915), and Borden Storage Building (c. 1920). The Goldsboro Cotton Mills is a two-story, 16 bays long, gable-front, brick building with Italianate  style detailing.  It features a central three-story square tower, three bays in width.

It was listed on the National Register of Historic Places in 2005.

References

Goldsboro, North Carolina
Industrial buildings and structures on the National Register of Historic Places in North Carolina
Italianate architecture in North Carolina
Industrial buildings completed in 1892
Buildings and structures in Wayne County, North Carolina
National Register of Historic Places in Wayne County, North Carolina